Malacopterus is a genus of beetles in the family Cerambycidae, containing the following species:

 Malacopterus pavidus (Germar, 1824)
 Malacopterus tenellus (Fabricius, 1801)

References

Xystrocerini